San Fermo della Battaglia is a  (municipality) in the Province of Como in the Italian region of Lombardy, located about  north of Milan and about  southwest of Como.

With  meaning "of the battle", the town is named after the battle which took place there between Garibaldi's Hunters of the Alps and Austrian militaries in 1859.

San Fermo della Battaglia borders the following municipalities: Como, Montano Lucino.

Demographic evolution

Well-known personalities 
Famous visitors from around the world are reported to reside here but prefer to remain unknown. It is also the home of film director .

References

External links
 www.comune.sanfermodellabattaglia.co.it

Cities and towns in Lombardy